The 1985–86 Sussex County Football League season was the 61st in the history of Sussex County Football League a football competition in England.

Division One

Division One featured 14 clubs which competed in the division last season, along with two new clubs, promoted from Division Two:
Chichester City
Shoreham

League table

Division Two

Division Two featured 13 clubs which competed in the division last season, along with three new clubs:
Bosham, promoted from Division Three
Oakwood, promoted from Division Three
Wick, relegated from Division One

League table

Division Three

Division Three featured twelve clubs which competed in the division last season, along with three new clubs:
APV Athletic
Bexhill Town, relegated from Division Two
Leftovers Sports Club

League table

References

1985-86
1985–86 in English football leagues